Four disciplines of cycling will be contested at the 2017 Bolivarian Games: road cycling, track cycling, mountain biking and bicycle motocross (BMX). A total of twenty-nine medal events will be held.

Medal summary

Road cycling

Track cycling

Men

Women

Mountain biking

BMX

Medal table

References

Cycling
Bolivarian Games
2017 Bolivarian GAmes
Bolivarian Games
Bolivarian Games
Bolivarian Games
Bolivarian Games